James A. Garfield (1831–1881) was the president of the United States in 1881.

James Garfield may also refer to:
James Rudolph Garfield (1865–1950), son of the President who served as United States Secretary of the Interior
James Garfield (footballer) (1874–1949), English footballer
James A. Garfield (ship)

See also

Garfield, James